Fred Moore was an English professional footballer who played as a forward.

Career
Born in Worksop, Moore joined Bradford City from Anston Athletic in February 1927. He made 6 league appearances for the club, scoring 3 goals. He left the club in June 1927 to join Worksop Town, and later played for Halifax Town.

Sources

References

Year of birth missing
Year of death missing
English footballers
Bradford City A.F.C. players
Worksop Town F.C. players
Halifax Town A.F.C. players
English Football League players
Association football forwards